Muhammad Syarifuddin bin Azman (born 24 November 2001) is a Malaysian motorcycle rider competing in the 2023 Moto3 World Championship for MT Helmets – MSI.

Career
Syarifuddin made his European motorcycling racing debut in the 2019 FIM CEV Moto3 Junior World Championship, replacing compatriot Idil Mahadi for the final round of the season in Valencia, scoring no points. He would get a full-time seat for 2020 however, scoring points in five of the eleven races held that year, with a season's best of 9th, in Jerez. He finished 19th in the championship, with 18 total points.

Moto3 World Championship
The breakthrough season for Syarifuddin was 2021, being a regular scorer of points throughout the season, and even winning his first race in the junior category. He won the first race held in Barcelona that season, finishing in front of well established talented riders such as David Muñoz, José Antonio Rueda, and Daniel Holgado. Altogether, Syarifuddin finished the championship 9th in the standings, with 64 points. He got his chance to make his debut in Grand Prix racing as well in 2021, replacing John McPhee during the Aragon Grand Prix (McPhee served as a replacement in the Moto2 class for Jake Dixon, who in turn replaced the injured Franco Morbidelli in the MotoGP class, after he was injured).

In 2022, Syarifuddin again races in the 2022 FIM JuniorGP World Championship, scoring three podiums throughout the season (all three 2nd place finishes), two in Barcelona, and one in Portimão. With three races to go, he currently sits 3rd in the championship, a single point behind 2nd, and two points in front of 4th. He also competed in three races in the 2022 Moto3 World Championship, replacing injured Alberto Surra in Portimão and Jerez, and rode as a wildcard rider in Barcelona, but scored no points. He would make another wildcard appearance in his home GP in Malaysia, and finished in 16th, just one place outside of the point scoring positions.

On 21 October 2022, during the 2022 Malaysian motorcycle Grand Prix, it was announced that Syarifuddin would ride full-time in the 2023 Moto3 World Championship, partnering Diogo Moreira at the MT Helmets-MSi Team.

MT Helmets – MSi (from 2023)
He will compete for the MT Helmets - MSi Racing Moto3 from 2023 season.

Career statistics

FIM CEV Moto3 Junior World Championship

Races by year
(key) (Races in bold indicate pole position, races in italics indicate fastest lap)

FIM JuniorGP World Championship

Races by year
(key) (Races in bold indicate pole position) (Races in italics indicate fastest lap)

Grand Prix motorcycle racing

By season

By class

Races by year
(key) (Races in bold indicate pole position, races in italics indicate fastest lap)

References

2001 births
Living people
Moto3 World Championship riders
Malaysian motorcycle racers
People from Selangor